Koeleria delavignei is a species of grass in the family Poaceae.

Its native range is Eastern Europe to Siberia.

References

Pooideae